Alexandr (Sasha) Kirsanov (born August 17, 1978) is a retired ice dancer who competed for the United States, Azerbaijan, and Russia. With Christie Moxley for the U.S., he is the 2003 Nebelhorn Trophy bronze medalist. He also competed with Barbara Hanley for Azerbaijan and with Olga Pogosian for Russia. Following his retirement from competition in 2004, he is a coach and choreographer in Delaware.

Competitive highlights 
(with Moxley for the U.S.)

(with Hanley for Azerbaijan)

(with Pogosian for Russia)

References 
 

1978 births
Living people
Figure skaters from Moscow
American male ice dancers
Russian male ice dancers
Azerbaijani male ice dancers
American figure skating coaches
Russian figure skating coaches
Competitors at the 2001 Winter Universiade